Venkataraju known by his professional name Rajanand (1927-2004), was an Indian actor in the Kannada film industry. Some of the notable films of Rajanand as an actor include Operation Diamond Racket (1978), Mayura (1975), and Eradu Kanasu (1974).

Career 
Rajanand contributed to more than 318 Kannada films as an actor, and he directed 350 drama/theater plays. He had written thousands of Vachanas and around 3,000 poems and 9,000 Kavanas. Rajanand completed a 480 feet length dialogue in one take in his debut film Dhana Pishachi (1967).

Rajanand started the Ranga Vaibhava theatre group in 1965.

Selected filmography

Rangamahal Rahasya (1970)
Mayura (1975)
Bahaddur Gandu (1976)
Bhagyavantharu (1977)
Thayige Thakka Maga (1978)
Putani Agent 123 (1979)
Bhakta Siriyala (1980)
Guru Shishyaru (1981)
Bhaktha Prahlada (1983)
Ranadheera (1988)
Devatha Manushya (1988)
 Kunthi Puthra (1994)

Award

 Dr. Vishnuvardhan Award (Lifetime Contribution to Kannada Cinema Award) (2001–02)

Personal life
Rajanand actively participated in theatre/drama plays at the age of 10 and received training from drama groups like Kalkoti, Samaja Vikasana, Kamala Kala, and from drama artists Sorat Ashwath, Master Hirannaiah, Yoganarasimha and A. S. Seshachar. Rajanand worked in drama companies like Gubbi Veeranna drama company, and Master Hirannaiah's drama company. He was named 'Rajanand' (meaning: King pleasure), during his time in Gubbi Veeranna drama company. He was married to Vimalamma (1942–2021). They had a son, Ravichandra. The family resided in Mysore.

See also

Cinema of Karnataka
List of Indian film actors
Cinema of India

References

Male actors in Kannada cinema
Indian male film actors
Male actors from Karnataka
20th-century Indian male actors
21st-century Indian male actors
1927 births
2004 deaths